The 1980–81 Athenian League season was the 58th in the history of Athenian League. The league consisted of 20 teams.

Clubs
The league joined 1 new team:
 Basildon United, from Essex Senior League

League table

References

1980–81 in English football leagues
Athenian League